Innocent Maela (born 14 August 1992) is a South African professional soccer player who plays as a defender for Orlando Pirates and the South Africa national football team.

Personal
He is the son of footballer Eric Maela and he is also paternal half-brother of Tsepo Masilela.

References

4.  orlandopiratesfc.com

External links

1992 births
Living people
South African soccer players
Association football defenders
Witbank Spurs F.C. players
Thanda Royal Zulu F.C. players
Orlando Pirates F.C. players
South African Premier Division players
South Africa international soccer players